The Yellow Ticket is a 1918 American silent drama film directed by William Parke and starring Fannie Ward. It is based on Michael Morton's 1914 play The Yellow Ticket. This screen adaptation of the play is currently classified as a lost film.

Plot
Anna Mirrel, a young Jewish girl in Czarist Russia, is forced to pretend to be a prostitute to obtain a passport (a "yellow ticket") in order to visit her father, whom she believes to be ill. When she arrives in St. Petersburg, she learns that her father has been killed. She encounters a young journalist and tells him of the crimes the state perpetrates against its citizens.

Cast
 Fannie Ward as Anna Mirrel
 Milton Sills as Julian rolfe
 Warner Oland as Baron Andrey
 Armand Kaliz as Count rostov
 J. H. Gilmour as U. S. Consul Seaton
 Helene Chadwick as Miss Seaton
 Leon Bary as Petrov Paviak
 Anna Lehr as Mary Varenka
 Dan Mason as Isaac Mirrel

Uncredited cast
 Nicholas Dunaew 
 Edward Elkas
 Charles Jackson (*as Charley Jackson)
 Richard Thornton

Production
The film was produced by Astra Films and distributed by Pathé Exchange.

References

See also
 The Yellow Ticket (1914 Broadway play)
 The Yellow Ticket (1928 Soviet film)
 The Yellow Ticket (1931 American film)

External links

1918 films
American silent feature films
American films based on plays
Lost American films
American black-and-white films
Silent American drama films
1918 drama films
Pathé Exchange films
Films directed by William Parke
Films set in Russia
1918 lost films
Lost drama films
1910s American films
1910s English-language films